Cymbopogon flexuosus, also called Cochin grass, East-Indian lemon grass or Malabar grass, is a perennial grass native to India, Sri Lanka, Burma, and Thailand. It is placed in the genus Cymbopogon (lemongrasses).

Its essential oil is produced by steam distillation of the freshly cut leaves, or it can be extracted using alcohol.

List of cultivars
 I cauvery 
 Krishna

References

flexuosus
Grasses of Asia
Grasses of India
Flora of the Indian subcontinent
Flora of Myanmar
Flora of Thailand